Glenelly St Joseph's  is a Gaelic Athletic Association club. The club is based in Plumbridge, County Tyrone, Northern Ireland and serves the parish of Badoney Upper, which includes the villages of Plumbridge and Cranagh. The club concentrates on Gaelic football, with ladies Gaelic football also provided for.

The men's senior team in 2017 will compete in Division 3 of the Tyrone All-County Football League and will play in the Tyrone Junior Football Championship.

The ladies senior team in 2015 will compete in Division 2 of the Tyrone Ladies All-County Football League and will play in the Tyrone Senior Ladies Football Championship.

Tyrone feile champions 2014

See also
 Tyrone GAA
 List of Gaelic games clubs

External links
 Glenelly St Joseph's GAC Website
 Tyrone GAA Club Website

Gaelic games clubs in County Tyrone
Gaelic football clubs in County Tyrone